Man Ray (born Emmanuel Radnitzky; August 27, 1890 – November 18, 1976) was an American visual artist who spent most of his career in Paris. He was a significant contributor to the Dada and Surrealist movements, although his ties to each were informal. He produced major works in a variety of media but considered himself a painter above all. He was best known for his pioneering photography, and was a renowned fashion and portrait photographer. He is also noted for his work with photograms, which he called "rayographs" in reference to himself.

Biography

Background and early life

During his career, Man Ray allowed few details of his early life or family background to be known to the public. He even refused to acknowledge that he ever had a name other than Man Ray.

Man Ray's birth name was Emmanuel Radnitzky. He was born in South Philadelphia on August 27, 1890. He was the eldest child of Russian Jewish immigrants Melach "Max" Radnitzky, a tailor, and Manya "Minnie" Radnitzky (née Lourie or Luria). He had a brother, Sam, and two sisters, Dorothy "Dora" and Essie (or Elsie), the youngest born in 1897 shortly after they settled at 372 Debevoise St. in the Williamsburg neighborhood of Brooklyn, New York. In early 1912, the Radnitzky family changed their surname to Ray. Man Ray's brother chose the surname in reaction to the ethnic discrimination and antisemitism prevalent at the time. Emmanuel, who was called "Manny" as a nickname, changed his first name to Man and gradually began to use Man Ray as his name.

Man Ray's father worked in a garment factory and ran a small tailoring business out of the family home. He enlisted his children to assist him from an early age. Man Ray's mother enjoyed designing the family's clothes and inventing patchwork items from scraps of fabric. Man Ray wished to disassociate himself from his family background, but their tailoring left an enduring mark on his art. Mannequins, flat irons, sewing machines, needles, pins, threads, swatches of fabric, and other items related to tailoring appear in almost every medium of his work. Art historians have noted similarities between Ray's collage and painting techniques and styles used for tailoring.

Mason Klein, curator of a Man Ray exhibition at the Jewish Museum in New York, Alias Man Ray: The Art of Reinvention, suggests that the artist may have been "the first Jewish avant-garde artist."

Man Ray was the uncle of the photographer Naomi Savage, who learned some of Ray's techniques and incorporated them into her own work.

First artistic endeavors

Man Ray displayed artistic and mechanical abilities during childhood. His education at Brooklyn's Boys' High School from 1904 to 1909 provided him with solid grounding in drafting and other basic art techniques. While he attended school, he educated himself with frequent visits to the local art museums, where he studied the works of the Old Masters. After his graduation, Ray was offered a scholarship to study architecture but chose to pursue a career as an artist. Man Ray's parents were disappointed by their son's decision to pursue art, but they agreed to rearrange the family's modest living quarters so that Ray's room could be his studio. The artist remained in the family home over the next four years. During this time, he worked steadily towards becoming a professional painter. Man Ray earned money as a commercial artist and was a technical illustrator at several Manhattan companies.

The surviving examples of his work from this period indicate that he attempted mostly paintings and drawings in 19th-century styles. He was already an avid admirer of contemporary avant-garde art, such as the European modernists he saw at Alfred Stieglitz's "291" gallery and works by the Ashcan School. However, with a few exceptions, he was not yet able to integrate these trends into his own work. The art classes he sporadically attended, including stints at the National Academy of Design and the Art Students League, were of little apparent benefit to him. When he enrolled in the Ferrer School in the autumn of 1912, he began a period of intense and rapid artistic development.

New York

While living in New York City, Man Ray was influenced by the avant-garde practices of European contemporary artists he was introduced to at the 1913 Armory Show and in visits to Alfred Stieglitz's "291" art gallery. His early paintings display facets of cubism. After befriending Marcel Duchamp, who was interested in showing movement in static paintings, his works began to depict movement of the figures. An example is the repetitive positions of the dancer's skirts in The Rope Dancer Accompanies Herself with Her Shadows (1916).

In 1915, Man Ray had his first solo show of paintings and drawings after he had taken up residence at an art colony in Grantwood, New Jersey, across the Hudson River from New York City. His first proto-Dada object, an assemblage titled Self-Portrait, was exhibited the following year. He produced his first significant photographs in 1918, after initially picking up the camera to document his own artwork.

Man Ray abandoned conventional painting to involve himself with Dada, a radical anti-art movement. He published two Dadaist periodicals, that each only had one issue, The Ridgefield Gazook (1915) and TNT (1919), the latter co-edited by Adolf Wolff and Mitchell Dawson. He started making objects and developed unique mechanical and photographic methods of making images. For the 1918 version of Rope Dancer, he combined a spray-gun technique with a pen drawing. Like Duchamp, he worked with readymades—ordinary objects that are selected and modified. His Gift readymade (1921) is a flatiron with metal tacks attached to the bottom, and Enigma of Isidore Ducasse is an unseen object (a sewing machine) wrapped in cloth and tied with cord. Aerograph (1919), another work from this period, was done with airbrush on glass.

In 1920, Man Ray helped Duchamp make the Rotary Glass Plates, one of the earliest examples of kinetic art. It was composed of glass plates turned by a motor. That same year, Man Ray, Katherine Dreier, and Duchamp founded the Société Anonyme, an itinerant collection that was the first museum of modern art in the U.S. In 1941 the collection was donated to Yale University Art Gallery.

Man Ray teamed up with Duchamp to publish one issue of New York Dada in 1920. For Man Ray, Dada's experimentation was no match for the wild and chaotic streets of New York. He wrote that "Dada cannot live in New York. All New York is dada, and will not tolerate a rival."

In 1913, Man Ray met his first wife, the Belgian poet Adon Lacroix (Donna Lecoeur) (1887–1975), in New York. They married in 1914, separated in 1919, and formally divorced in 1937.

Paris

In July 1921, Man Ray went to live and work in Paris, France. He soon settled in the Montparnasse quarter favored by many artists. His accidental rediscovery of the cameraless photogram, which he called "rayographs", resulted in mysterious images hailed by Tristan Tzara as "pure Dada creations".

Shortly after arriving in Paris, he met and fell in love with Kiki de Montparnasse (Alice Prin), an artists' model and celebrated character in Paris bohemian circles. Kiki was Man Ray's companion for most of the 1920s. She became the subject of some of his most famous photographic images, and starred in his experimental films Le Retour à la Raison and L'Étoile de mer.

In 1929, he began a love affair with the Surrealist photographer Lee Miller. She was also his photographic assistant and, together, they reinvented the photographic technique of solarization. Miller left him in 1932.

She was a Guadeloupean dancer and model and she appears in many of his photographs. When Ray fled the Nazi occupation in France, Adrienne chose to stay behind to care for her family. Unlike the artist's other significant muses, until 2022, Fidelin had largely been written out of his life story.

Man Ray was a pioneering photographer in Paris for two decades between the wars. Significant members of the art world, such as Pablo Picasso, Tristan Tzara, James Joyce, Gertrude Stein, Jean Cocteau, Salvador Dalí, Peggy Guggenheim, Bridget Bate Tichenor, Luisa Casati, and Antonin Artaud, posed for his camera. Man Ray's international fame as a portrait photographer is reflected in a series of photographs of Maharajah Yashwant Rao Holkar II and his wife Sanyogita Devi from their visit to Europe in 1927. In the winter of 1933, surrealist artist Méret Oppenheim, known for her fur-covered teacup, posed nude for Man Ray in a well-known series of photographs depicting her standing next to a printing press.

His practice of photographing African objects in the Paris collections of Paul Guillaume and Charles Ratton and others led to several iconic photographs, including Noire et blanche. As Man Ray scholar Wendy A. Grossman has illustrated, "no one was more influential in translating the vogue for African art into a Modernist photographic aesthetic than Man Ray."

Man Ray was represented in the first Surrealist exhibition with Jean Arp, Max Ernst, André Masson, Joan Miró, and Pablo Picasso at the Galerie Pierre in Paris in 1925. Important works from this time were a metronome with an eye, originally titled Object to Be Destroyed, and the Violon d'Ingres, a stunning photograph of Kiki de Montparnasse, styled after the painter/musician Ingres. Violon d'Ingres is a popular example of how Man Ray could juxtapose disparate elements in his photography to generate meaning.
Man Ray directed a number of influential avant-garde short films, known as Cinéma Pur. He directed Le Retour à la Raison (2 mins, 1923); Emak-Bakia (16 mins, 1926); L'Étoile de Mer (15 mins, 1928); and Les Mystères du Château de Dé (27 mins, 1929). Man Ray also assisted Marcel Duchamp with the cinematography of his film Anemic Cinema (1926), and Ray personally manned the camera on Fernand Léger's Ballet Mécanique (1924). In René Clair's film Entr'acte (1924), Man Ray appeared in a brief scene playing chess with Duchamp. Duchamp, Man Ray, and Francis Picabia were all friends and collaborators, connected by their experimental, entertaining, and innovative art.

Hollywood
The Second World War forced Man Ray to return from Paris to the United States. He lived in Los Angeles from 1940 to 1951 where he focused his creative energy on painting. A few days after arriving in Los Angeles, he met Juliet Browner, a first-generation American of Romanian-Jewish lineage. She was a trained dancer who studied dance with Martha Graham, and an experienced artists' model. They married in 1946 in a double wedding with their friends Max Ernst and Dorothea Tanning. In 1948 Ray had a solo exhibition at the Copley Galleries in Beverly Hills, which brought together a wide array of work and featured his newly painted canvases of the Shakespearean Equations series.

Later life
Man Ray returned to Paris in 1951, and settled with Juliet into a studio at 2 bis rue Férou near the Luxembourg Gardens in St. Germain-des-Prés, where he continued his creative practice across mediums. During the last quarter century of his life, he returned to a number of his iconic earlier works, recreating them in new form. He also directed the production of limited-edition replicas of several of his objects, working first with Marcel Zerbib and later Arturo Schwarz.

In 1963, he published his autobiography, Self-Portrait (republished in 1999).

Ray continued to work on new paintings, photographs, collages and art objects until his death from a lung infection, in Paris, on November 18, 1976. He was interred in the Cimetière du Montparnasse in Paris. His epitaph reads "Unconcerned, but not indifferent". When Juliet died in 1991, she was interred in the same tomb. Her epitaph reads "Together again". Juliet organized a trust for Ray's work and donated much of his work to museums. Her plans to restore the studio as a public museum proved too expensive; such was the structure's disrepair. Most of the contents were stored at the Pompidou Centre.

Innovations
Man Ray was responsible for several technical innovations in modern art, filmmaking, and photography. These included his use of photograms to produce surrealist images he called "Rayograms", and solarization (rediscovered with Lee Miller). His 1923 experimental film Le Retour à la raison was the first 'cine-rayograph', a motion picture made without the use of a camera. Ray's 1935 Space Writing (Self-Portrait) was the first light painting, predating Picasso's 1949 light paintings, photographed by Gjon Mili, by fourteen years.

Accolades
In 1974, Man Ray received the Royal Photographic Society's Progress Medal and Honorary Fellowship "in recognition of any invention, research, publication or other contribution which has resulted in an important advance in the scientific or technological development of photography or imaging in the widest sense." In 1999, ARTnews magazine named Man Ray one of the 25 most influential artists of the 20th century. The publication cited his groundbreaking photography, "his explorations of film, painting, sculpture, collage, assemblage and prototypes of what would eventually be called performance art and conceptual art." ARTnews further stated that "Man Ray offered artists in all media an example of a creative intelligence that, in its 'pursuit of pleasure and liberty', unlocked every door it came to and walked freely where it would."

Art market
Man Ray's Le Violon d'Ingres (1924), a famed photograph depicting a nude Kiki de Montparnasse's back overlaid with a violin's f-holes, sold for $12.4 million on May 14, 2022, setting a new world record as the most expensive photograph ever to be sold at auction. The sale came after a drawn-out bidding period that lasted nearly ten minutes during Christie's New York's auction dedicated to Surrealist art.

On 9 November 2017 Man Ray's Noire et Blanche (1926), formerly in the collection of Jacques Doucet, was purchased at Christie's Paris for €2,688,750 (US$3,120,658), becoming (at that time) the 14th most expensive photograph to ever sell at auction. This was a record not only for Man Ray's work in the photographic medium but also for the sale at auction of any vintage photograph.

Only two other works by Man Ray in any medium have commanded more at auction than the price captured by the 2017 sale of Noire et blanche. His 1916 canvas Promenade sold for $5,877,000 on 6 November 2013, at the Sotheby's New York Impressionist & Modern Art Sale. And on 13 November 2017, his assemblage titled Catherine Barometer (1920), sold for $3,252,500 at Christie's in New York.

Legacy
Self-Portrait was republished in 1999.

In March 2013, Man Ray's photograph Noire et Blanche (1926) was featured in the US Postal Service's "Modern Art in America" series of stamps.

Selected publications
 Man Ray and Tristan Tzara (1922). Champs délicieux: album de photographies. Paris: [Société générale d'imprimerie et d'édition].
 Man Ray (1926). Revolving doors, 1916–1917: 10 planches. Paris: Éditions Surrealistes.
 Man Ray  (1934). Man Ray: photographs, 1920–1934, Paris. Hartford, Connecticut: James Thrall Soby.
 Éluard, Paul, and Man Ray (1935). Facile. Paris: Éditions G.L.M.
 Man Ray and André Breton (1937). La photographie n'est pas l'art. Paris: Éditions G.L.M.
 Man Ray and Paul Éluard (1937). Les mains libres: dessins. Paris: Éditions Jeanne Bucher.
 Man Ray (1948). Alphabet for adults. Beverly Hills, California: Copley Galleries.
 Man Ray (1963). Self portrait. London: Andre Deutsch.
 Man Ray and L. Fritz Gruber (1963). Portraits. Gütersloh, Germany: Sigbert Mohn Verlag.

See also

 The Gift, 1921 sculpture

References and sources

References

Sources
Alexandrian, Sarane. Man Ray; J. P. O'Hara;  (1973).
Allan, Kenneth R. "Metamorphosis in 391: A Cryptographic Collaboration by Francis Picabia, Man Ray, and Erik Satie" in Art History 34, No. 1 (February 2011): 102–125.
Baldwin, Neil. Man Ray: American Artist; Da Capo Press;  (1988, 2000).
Coleman, A. D. "Willful Provocateur"; ARTnews, May 1999.
Foresta, Merry, et al. Perpetual Motif: The Art of Man Ray. Washington: National Museum of American Art; New York: Abbeville Press, 1988.
Grossman, Wendy A., Adina Kamien-Kazhdan, Edouard Sebline, and Andrew Strauss. Man Ray—Human Equations: A Journey From Mathematics to Shakespeare; Hatje Cantz;  (2015).
Heyd, Milly. "Man Ray/Emmanuel Radnitsky: Who is Behind the Enigma of Isidore Ducasse?"; in Complex Identities: Jewish Consciousness and Modern Art; ed. Matthew Baigell and Milly Heyd; Rutgers University Press;  (2001).
Klein, Mason. Alias Man Ray: The Art of Reinvention; Yale University Press;  (2009).
Knowles, Kim, A Cinematic Artist: The Films of Man Ray. Bern; Oxford: Peter Lang;  (2009).
Mileaf, Janine. "Between You and Me: Man Ray's Object to be Destroyed," Art Journal 63, No. 1 (Spring 2004): 4–23.
Naumann, Francis. Conversion to Modernism: The Early Work of Man Ray; Rutgers University Press;  (2003).

External links

Works by Man Ray, Official Licensing Archive. Searchable; over 1,000 photos
Man Ray Trust

"Man Ray Laid Bare" from Tate Magazine
Man Ray's Subtle Surrealistic Genius Women

Collection of Man Ray short films

Man Ray letters and album, 1922–1976. Research Library at the Getty Research Institute. Los Angeles
Man Ray in the National Gallery of Australia's Kenneth Tyler collection

Man Ray at The Jewish Museum

Man Ray
American contemporary painters
1890 births
1976 deaths
Abstract painters
Dada
American autobiographers
American cinematographers
American experimental filmmakers
American male screenwriters
American surrealist artists
Surrealist filmmakers
American expatriates in France
American people of Russian-Jewish descent
Art Students League of New York alumni
Artists from Philadelphia
Burials at Montparnasse Cemetery
Jewish American artists
Jewish painters
Jewish American writers
People from Ridgefield, New Jersey
Photographers from New York (state)
American portrait photographers
20th-century American painters
20th-century American male artists
American male painters
20th-century American photographers
Boys High School (Brooklyn) alumni
Film directors from New York City
Film directors from New Jersey
American male non-fiction writers
Screenwriters from New York (state)
Screenwriters from Pennsylvania
Screenwriters from New Jersey
People from Williamsburg, Brooklyn
20th-century American male writers
20th-century American screenwriters
American dadaist